Richard Woodhouse Johnson (February 27, 1827April 21, 1897) was an officer in the Union Army during the American Civil War.

Life

Personal life
Richard Woodhouse Johnson was born on February 27, 1827, in Smithland, to James Johnson (1785–1837) and Louisa Harmon Johnson (1790–1837). Johnson married Rachael Elizabeth Steele (1826–1891). Their sons were Alfred Bainbridge Johnson (1853–1897) and Richard Woodhouse Johnson (1855–1929).

Early career
Johnson graduated from the United States Military Academy in 1849 and up to the time of the American Civil War was employed chiefly on frontier service. In 1861 he was commissioned lieutenant colonel of the 3rd Kentucky Cavalry Regiment and soon after was promoted to brigadier general, United States Volunteers. As a cavalry commander he took part in the western campaigns of 1861 and 1862. On August 21, 1862, he was defeated and captured by Colonel John Hunt Morgan, whom he had been sent to drive out of Tennessee.

In the Army of the Cumberland

In 1863 at the Battle of Stones River, Johnson commanded a division on the right flank under Major General Alexander McCook. Johnson's command was flanked from its position by the initial Confederate attack. At the Battle of Chickamauga, his division of the XX Corps formed part of the command of Maj. Gen. George Henry Thomas on the Union left. During the Battle of Chattanooga, his division was one of the several that charged up Missionary Ridge. The next year he commanded a division in the Army of the Cumberland during the invasion of Georgia and was severely wounded at the Battle of New Hope Church on May 28, 1864.

In the midst of the Battle of Utoy Creek, Johnson assumed command of the XIV Corps when the previous commander, John M. Palmer, abruptly resigned due to a rank dispute.  Johnson briefly led the corps through the rest of August.

Cavalry service
On August 22, 1864, Johnson was made chief of cavalry of the Military Division of the Mississippi. He commanded a cavalry division at the Battle of Nashville. On the second day of the battle, Johnson was given the brevet rank of major general of volunteers, supplemented on March 13, 1865, by the brevet rank of brigadier general in the regular army, and on the same day was brevetted major general in the regular army for "gallant and meritorious services during the war". Johnson was left behind when Maj. Gen. James H. Wilson began his raid into Alabama in 1865.

Post war
Johnson was mustered out of the volunteer service on January 15, 1866, and became provost marshal general of the Military Division of the Tennessee, and later acting judge advocate in various military departments. He resigned in 1867 with the rank of major, which grade by an Act of Congress (March 3, 1875) was changed to that of brigadier general. He published A Soldier's Reminiscences in Peace and War (1866) and a Memoir of Major General George H. Thomas (1881). 

On December 6, 1865, Johnson was elected as a Veteran Companion of the Pennsylvania Commandery of the Military Order of the Loyal Legion of the United States (MOLLUS), a military society of officers who had served in the Union armed forces during the Civil War. He was assigned MOLLUS insignia number 99.

Johnson ran for Governor of Minnesota in 1881 as a Democrat, but lost to Republican Lucius Frederick Hubbard; he received about 35% of the vote.

Johnson died on April 21, 1897, in Saint Paul, Minnesota, and is buried there in Oakland Cemetery.

See also

List of American Civil War Generals (Union)

Footnotes

References
 Cozzens, Peter, No Better Place to Die: The Battle of Stones River, University of Illinois Press, 1990, .
 Cozzens, Peter, The Shipwreck of Their Hopes: The Battles for Chattanooga, Chicago: University of Illinois Press, 1994, .
 Cozzens, Peter, This Terrible Sound: The Battle of Chickamauga, University of Illinois Press, 1992, .

External links

American military writers
United States Military Academy alumni
United States Army officers
People of Kentucky in the American Civil War
1827 births
1897 deaths
People from Livingston County, Kentucky
Union Army generals